Fatih Nurullah Turan (born 5 April 1993) is a footballer who plays as a right-back for Belgian club Sporting Hasselt. He made his Eerste Divisie debut for Fortuna Sittard on 18 March 2011. Born in Belgium, he represented Turkey at international youth levels.

International career
Turan represented Turkey at the 2013 FIFA U-20 World Cup.

References

External links
 Voetbal International profile 
 Fatih Turan at TFF.org
 
 
 

1993 births
Living people
Sportspeople from Genk
Turkish footballers
Belgian footballers
Footballers from Limburg (Belgium)
Association football fullbacks
Turkey under-21 international footballers
Turkey youth international footballers
Eerste Divisie players
TFF First League players
Fortuna Sittard players
Boluspor footballers
Vanspor footballers
Karacabey Belediyespor footballers
Turkish expatriate footballers
Belgian expatriate footballers
Belgian expatriate sportspeople in the Netherlands
Expatriate footballers in the Netherlands
Belgian expatriate sportspeople in Turkey